Thierstein may refer to:

Thierstein District, in the canton of Solothurn, Switzerland
Thierstein, Bavaria, a municipality  in the district of Wunsiedel, Germany
the House of Thierstein, a noble family in medieval Switzerland